Yves Lamarque (born 30 November 1967) is a French rower.

Lamarque was born in Dax, Landes, France, in 1967. He competed at the 1992 Summer Olympics in Barcelona in quadruple sculls partnered with Fiorenzo Di Giovanni, Fabrice LeClerc, and Samuel Barathay where they came sixth. He won a gold medal at the 1993 World Rowing Championships in Račice partnered with Barathay in the men's double sculls. He competed at the 1996 Summer Olympics in Atlanta, again in quadruple sculls, this time partnered with Vincent Lepvraud, Sébastien Vieilledent, and LeClerc where they came twelfth.

References

1967 births
Living people
French male rowers
World Rowing Championships medalists for France
Rowers at the 1992 Summer Olympics
Rowers at the 1996 Summer Olympics
Olympic rowers of France
Sportspeople from Landes (department)
People from Dax, Landes